Puerto Rico Highway 588 (PR-588) is a tertiary mountainous state highway in Ponce, Puerto Rico. The road is approximately 1.5 kilometers long and is a spur of Puerto Rico Highway 504.

Route description
At its southern terminus, the road starts at coordinates  in its intersection with Puerto Rico Highway PR-504, and terminates at its northern terminus at coordinates  at its intersection with Camino La Zarza. The road runs north to south, and mostly along Río Chiquito in barrio Portugués.  The southern terminus connects at kilometer mark 3.0 of PR-504. Its northern terminus connects with Camino La Zarza, which leads eastwardly back to PR-504 via Camino Rio Chiquito Hoyos, which becomes Camino La Cuchilla in its approach to PR-504. This Camino Rio Chiquito Hoyos/Camino La Cuchilla run is about 0.9 kilometers long.

Major intersections

See also

 List of highways in Ponce, Puerto Rico
 List of highways numbered 588

References

External links
 Guía de Carreteras Principales, Expresos y Autopistas 

588
Roads in Ponce, Puerto Rico